Shireen Jawad (born 10 August 1971) is a Bengali singer born and raised in Britain with roots in Bangladesh.

Early life
Jawad was born and brought up in East London, England. Her first memories are of singing on her father's lap at the age of two She began singing Bollywood songs from an early age as a hobby. She was encouraged by her father to learn music. Her first performances were at school. Her inspiration came from her late mother and her father who used to play traditional Bangla folk music at home.

Career
Jawad qualified as a social worker before becoming a professional singer. At the age of 19, she had her first public performance and moved on to singing Bengali folk songs to larger audiences. She has performed at community functions and Melas across the UK, winning prizes at the 2002 Bethnal Green Festival and at the Asianet Talent Competition.

In 2007, Jawad's debut album Panjabiwala was released, co-recorded with Habib Wahid the album features a collection of songs given to Jawad by her late mother. In 2009, her second album Mathwali was released by Laser Vision, which features a selection of songs Jawad collated from all regions of Bangladesh. In April 2013, her third album Rangeela was released by Laser Vision, featuring Habib Wahid, Bappa Majumdar, Fuad, Hridoy Khan, Rumel, Rumman, Rafa and Raihan. Jawad has also worked with producers Habib Wahid and Fuad Almuktader.

Jawad regularly performs in UK, Bangladesh and the US as well as Denmark, Italy and Spain. In August 2015, she performed at the Barclaycard Arena in Birmingham.

Jawad's main focus is traditional Asian folk and spiritual music.

Discography

Singles

Albums

See also
British Bangladeshi
List of British Bangladeshis

References

External links

1971 births
Living people
English Muslims
English people of Bangladeshi descent
Bengali-language singers
Hindi-language singers
English social workers
Singers from London
Laser Vision artists
21st-century English women singers
21st-century English singers